Bohdanivka is a village in Volnovakha Raion (district) in Donetsk Oblast of eastern Ukraine, at 57.7 km SSW from the centre of Donetsk city.

The War in Donbass, that started in mid-April 2014, has brought along both civilian and military casualties. Three Ukrainian servicemen were killed at the village on 27 June 2018.

Demographics
In 2001 the settlement had 90 inhabitants. Native language as of the Ukrainian Census of 2001:
Ukrainian — 53.33%
Russian — 45.56%

References

Villages in Volnovakha Raion